14th meridian may refer to:

14th meridian east, a line of longitude east of the Greenwich Meridian
14th meridian west, a line of longitude west of the Greenwich Meridian